Camp Half-Blood Chronicles is a media franchise created by author Rick Riordan, encompassing three five-part novel series, two short-story collections, two myth anthology books, a stand-alone short story, three crossover short stories, an essay collection, multiple guides, seven graphic novels, two films, a video game, a musical, and other media.  Set in the modern world, it focuses on groups of demigod teenagers, and features many characters from Greek and Roman mythology. The first series, Percy Jackson & the Olympians, follows the adventures of a teen named Percy Jackson at a summer camp for Greek demigods. The second series, The Heroes of Olympus, introduces several more lead characters and a second camp for Roman demigods named Camp Jupiter. The third series, The Trials of Apollo, follows the now-mortal god Apollo, with appearances by many characters from the first and second series.

The franchise takes place in the same fictional universe as two of Riordan's other series, The Kane Chronicles (which centers on Egyptian mythology) and Magnus Chase and the Gods of Asgard (set in the world of Norse mythology). Three short stories have been published which join The Kane Chronicles and the Camp Half-Blood Chronicles; Camp Half-Blood characters have also appeared in both the Magnus and Kane books.

Novel series

Percy Jackson & the Olympians

Percy Jackson & the Olympians is a pentalogy of adventure and fiction books written by Rick Riordan. Set in the United States, the books are predominantly based on Greek mythology and deal with a demigod, Percy Jackson, and his quest to stop the rise of the Titan lord Kronos from rising from Tartarus. All five books are seen from Percy's witty and sardonic point of view. The series tackles themes like coming of age, love and teenage angst. More than 69 million copies of the books have been sold in more than 35 countries.

As of July 19, 2020, the series has been on the New York Times best seller list for children's book series for 538 weeks.

The Lightning Thief

The Lightning Thief is the first book in the Percy Jackson and the Olympians series. It introduces Percy Jackson, Annabeth Chase, and Grover Underwood, and follows their quest to recover Zeus' stolen master bolt, which was thought to be stolen by Hades. It was released on July 1, 2005.

The Sea of Monsters

The Sea of Monsters is the second book in the Percy Jackson and the Olympians series. In this book, Percy, Annabeth, and Tyson, Percy's cyclops brother, need to go to the Bermuda Triangle, also known as the Sea of Monsters, in order to find the Golden Fleece to save their camp and to rescue their satyr friend Grover from the cyclops Polyphemus. It was released April 1, 2006.

The Titan's Curse

The Titan's Curse is the third book in the Percy Jackson and the Olympians series. The book features Percy, Grover, Thalia Grace, Zoë Nightshade, and Bianca di Angelo traveling to San Francisco in order to rescue the goddess Artemis and Annabeth. It was released on May 11, 2007.

The Battle of the Labyrinth

The Battle of the Labyrinth is the fourth book in the Percy Jackson and the Olympians series. In the book, Percy, Annabeth, Grover, Tyson, Nico di Angelo, and Rachel Elizabeth Dare are tasked with finding Daedalus in the Labyrinth so he can help them keep their camp safe against the Titan army. In this book, Percy also meets Calypso. The book was released on May 6, 2008.

The Last Olympian
 
The Last Olympian is the fifth and final book in the Percy Jackson and the Olympians series. In the book, all the demigods from Camp Half-Blood help defend Manhattan, in particular the Empire State Building a.k.a. Mount Olympus against Kronos and his army while the gods fight Typhon. The book was released on May 5, 2009.

The Heroes of Olympus

The Heroes of Olympus is a pentalogy of books written by Riordan. It chronicles the events of seven demigods and their obstacles involving the waking of the earth goddess, Gaea, and their efforts to stop her. It picks up a year after the end of the Percy Jackson & the Olympians series. Themes include love and teenage angst, as well as dealing with homosexuality.

Riordan based some of his series on The Golden Fleece and the Heroes Who Lived Before Achilles by Padraic Colum.

The Lost Hero

The Lost Hero is the first book in The Heroes of Olympus series. It features three new heroes, Roman demigod Jason Grace, as well as Greek demigods Piper McLean and Leo Valdez travelling to California in order to rescue Hera from being consumed by the giants and to defeat the king of giants, Porphyrion. It was released on October 12, 2010.

The Son of Neptune 

The Son of Neptune is the second book in The Heroes of Olympus series. The book features Percy Jackson and two new heroes, Roman demigods Hazel Levesque and Frank Zhang traveling to Alaska to free Thanatos, the God of Death, from the giant Alcyoneus. It was released on October 4, 2011.

The Mark of Athena 

The Mark of Athena is the third book in The Heroes of Olympus series. The book features Percy Jackson, Annabeth Chase, Jason Grace, Piper McLean, Leo Valdez, Hazel Levesque, and Frank Zhang traveling to Greece to prevent Gaea's awakening while simultaneously also trying to uncover the gigantic long-lost statue of Athena, the Athena Parthenos, in Rome. It was released on October 2, 2012.

The House of Hades 

The House of Hades is the fourth book in The Heroes of Olympus series. It features Jason Grace, Piper McLean, Leo Valdez, Hazel Levesque, Frank Zhang, and Nico di Angelo as they continue to set sail towards Greece with the rescue of Percy Jackson and Annabeth Chase, both of whom have fallen to Tartarus in the previous book's epilogue, in mind; the latter couple in turn also try to find their own way out of the hellish realm. The book also reintroduces Calypso. The book was released on October 8, 2013.

The Blood of Olympus 

The Blood of Olympus is the fifth and final book in The Heroes of Olympus series. It features two parallel stories: the first has the seven demigods finally reaching Greece and working to defeat the giants at the Acropolis of Athens, while the second has Reyna Ramírez-Arellano, Nico di Angelo, and Coach Gleeson Hedge delivering the Athena Parthenos back to Camp Half-Blood with the clash of the Greek and Roman camps in the horizon. The book was released on October 7, 2014.

The Trials of Apollo 

The Trials of Apollo is a pentalogy of books written by Riordan. It chronicles the life of Apollo after his being made mortal by Zeus as a punishment for his actions during The Heroes of Olympus series. The first book, The Hidden Oracle, was featured on May 5, 2016. It also features most of the characters from The Heroes of Olympus and Percy Jackson and the Olympians series.

The Hidden Oracle

The Hidden Oracle is the first book in The Trials of Apollo series. It was released on May 3, 2016. It features Apollo as a 16 year old mortal named Lester Papadopoulos and introduces a new demigod Meg McCaffrey as they travel to Camp Half-Blood and fight monsters sent by Emperor Nero in order to save the Oracle of Dodona. It also sees the return of Leo Valdez who was presumed to be dead and was resurrected in the last book of Heroes of Olympus, Blood of Olympus.

The Dark Prophecy

The Dark Prophecy is the second book in The Trials of Apollo series. It was released on May 2, 2017. It features Apollo going on a journey with Leo Valdez and Calypso to find Oracle of Trophonius and preventing it from falling to the hand of Emperor Commodus.

The Burning Maze

The Burning Maze is the third book in The Trials of Apollo series. It was released on May 1, 2018. It features Apollo, Meg, Grover, Piper McLean, and Jason Grace as they go to free the Oracle of Erythraea who has been imprisoned by Emperor Caligula. They also stop Caligula’s plan to make himself the sun god with Apollo’s and Helios’s essence.

The Tyrant's Tomb
The Tyrant's Tomb is the fourth book in The Trials of Apollo series. It was released on September 24, 2019. It features Apollo, Meg, Hazel Levesque, Reyna Ramirez-Arellano, and new hero Lavinia Asimov as they race to free the god Harpocrates and save Camp Jupiter from King Tarquin, Emperors Commodus and Caligula, and their respective armies. The goddess Diana, the Roman form of Apollo's twin sister, also made an appearance.

The Tower of Nero
The Tower of Nero is the fifth and final book in The Trials of Apollo series. It was released on October 6, 2020. It features Apollo, Meg, Rachel Elizabeth Dare, Nico di Angelo, and his boyfriend and Apollo's son Will Solace as they fight to prevent Emperor Nero from burning New York City. Apollo must also defeat his nemesis Python, who has been controlling Apollo's source of prophetic prowess in the caves of Delphi, and regain his immortality.

Standalone novels

The Sun and the Star 

On October 6, 2021, it was announced that Riordan would write a new book centered on Nico di Angelo and Will Solace, continuing story threads hinted in The Tower of Nero. He will collaborate with writer Mark Oshiro. The book was announced to bear the title The Sun and the Star on September 23, 2022, with its release set for May 2, 2023.

Percy Jackson and the Chalice of the Gods 
A standalone novel, Percy Jackson and the Chalice of the Gods, was announced in October 2022, with a release date of September 26, 2023. The book covers events that take place between The Heroes of Olympus and The Trials of Apollo. The novel will be written from Percy's point of view, much like in the Percy Jackson & the Olympians series.

Fictional timeline

Short story collections

The Demigod Files

The Demigod Files is a collection published by Hyperion on February 10, 2009, written entirely by Riordan. It is a companion book to the first series, Percy Jackson & the Olympians, and its main contents are four short stories: "Percy Jackson and the Stolen Chariot", "Percy Jackson and the Bronze Dragon", and "Percy Jackson and the Sword of Hades", and the first chapter of The Last Olympian (the fifth novel, published a few months later). Additional contents include interviews with some of the campers, a drawing of Annabeth's open camp trunk and a "Map of Camp Half-Blood" by Steve James, glossy color illustrations of eight characters by Antonio Caparo, and various crossword puzzles and other activities. The narrative setting is between the fourth and fifth novels.

The Demigod Diaries

The Demigod Diaries is a collection published by Hyperion on August 14, 2012, written by Rick and his son Haley Riordan. It is a companion to the second series, The Heroes of Olympus, nearly identical in structure to The Demigod Files. The main contents are four stories: "The Diary of Luke Castellan", "Percy Jackson and the Staff of Hermes", "Leo Valdez and the Quest for Buford" and, by Haley Riordan, "Son of Magic". It contains puzzles, games, black-and-white drawings by Steve James, and glossy color illustrations of  characters by Antonio Caparo.

Percy Jackson and the Singer of Apollo
Percy Jackson and the Singer of Apollo is a short story appearing in the Guys Read anthology Other Worlds. It features Percy Jackson and Grover Underwood in New York City trying to recover the gold Singer of Apollo.

Camp Half-Blood/Kane Chronicles crossovers (Demigods and Magicians)
The Camp Half-Blood/Kane Chronicles crossovers are a series of short stories that feature two characters each, one from Percy Jackson & the Olympians and one from The Kane Chronicles. They were published in a collection titled Demigods and Magicians on April 5, 2016.

The Son of Sobek

The Son of Sobek is a 2013 crossover novel between the Percy Jackson and the Kane Chronicles series. It features Percy Jackson and Carter Kane fighting a giant crocodile in Long Island. It was originally published in the paperback edition of The Serpent's Shadow and was later published as an e-short.

The Staff of Serapis

The Staff of Serapis is a continuation of The Son of Sobek, published in 2014. It features Annabeth Chase and Sadie Kane battling the god Serapis in Rockaway Beach in Queens. It was originally published in the paperback edition of The Mark of Athena and was later published as an e-short.

The Crown of Ptolemy

The Crown of Ptolemy, published in 2015, features all four characters that were in the first two stories. They need to stop the evil magician Setne from collecting the Upper and Lower Crowns of Egypt and becoming a god. The short was originally published in the paperback edition of The House of Hades along with the short story Percy Jackson and the Sword of Hades. It was later published as an e-short.

Demigods of Olympus
Demigods of Olympus is an interactive e-series in which the reader  is the main character. The first three stories were published in Rick Riordan's  application, Demigods of Olympus and the fourth was original to a collection of all four on July 14, 2015.

 "My Two Headed Guidance Counselor"
 "The Library of Deadly Weapons"
 "My Demon Satyr Tea Party"
 "My Personal Zombie Apocalypse"

Myth anthologies

Percy Jackson's Greek Gods

This book is a retelling of several mythological stories about the Greek Gods as narrated by Percy Jackson.  It was released on August 19, 2014.

Percy Jackson’s Greek Heroes
This book is a retelling of several mythological stories about various Greek heroes as narrated by Percy Jackson. It is the sequel to Percy Jackson’s Greek Gods. It was released on August 18, 2015.

Other books

Demigods and Monsters
Demigods and Monsters: Your Favorite Authors on Rick Riordan's Percy Jackson and the Olympians Series is a collection  of essays "edited by Rick Riordan with Leah Wilson" and published by Borders Group in 2008; an expanded edition was published by BenBella Books in 2013. The second edition front cover promotes both an "original introduction by Rick Riordan" and "New Essays: Updated through The Last Olympian". Leah Wilson is editor-in-chief of the Smart Pop series in which both the paperback first edition (2009) and the second edition were issued by BenBella.

The essays were written by people likely to be recognized by fans of the series.

The Ultimate Guide
Percy Jackson and the Olympians: The Ultimate Guide is a guide to the world of Percy Jackson written by Mary-Jane Knight, who is not credited on the front cover. It features illustrations of characters in the series by Antonio Caparo (as trading cards in pockets) and chapters about Percy Jackson, Camp Half-Blood, and places, gods, monsters, and items from mythology. It was released by Hyperion on January 18, 2010 (156 pp; 1-4231-2171-6) and termed Book 8 in the Percy Jackson series by Amazon or the publisher. The British edition was published by Puffin Books in March as Percy Jackson: The Ultimate Guide.

Camp Half-Blood Confidential 
Camp Half-Blood Confidential is a companion guide to the Trials of Apollo book series. Released on August 15, 2017, the guide follows the campers of Camp Half-Blood as they rediscover the lost Camp Half-Blood orientation video, directed and produced by the god Apollo. The book features transcripts, interviews, and a short story about the video and the campers who are watching it.

Camp Jupiter Classified: A Probatio's Journal 
Camp Jupiter Classified: A Probatio's Journal is a companion book to the Trials of Apollo series. Released on May 5, 2020, the short story follows a Probatio at Camp Jupiter named Claudia as she deals with the daily duties of being a member of the Twelfth Legion of Rome. The book offers an insight at the lives of campers at Camp Jupiter and the havoc that the battle with Gaea left on the camp.

Adaptations

Graphic novels
Some of the books have been adapted into graphic novels.

The Lightning Thief Graphic Novel
The Lightning Thief Graphic Novel is an adaptation of The Lightning Thief into a graphic novel. It was adapted by Robert Venditti, illustrated by Attila Futaki, and colored by José Villarrubia, and was published on October 12, 2010.

The Sea of Monsters Graphic Novel
The Sea of Monsters Graphic Novel is the graphic novel version of The Sea of Monsters. It was adapted by Robert Venditti, illustrated by Attila Futaki, and colored by Tamás Gáspár, and was published on July 2, 2013.

The Titan's Curse Graphic Novel
The Titan's Curse Graphic Novel is the graphic novel of The Titan's Curse. It was adapted by Robert Venditti, illustrated by Attila Futaki, and colored by Greg Guilhaumond, and was published on October 8, 2013.

The Lost Hero Graphic Novel
The Lost Hero Graphic Novel is the adaptation of The Lost Hero into a graphic novel. It was adapted by Robert Venditti, illustrated by Nate Powell, and colored by Orpheus Collar, and was published on October 7, 2014.

The Son of Neptune Graphic Novel
The Son of Neptune Graphic Novel is the adaptation of The Son of Neptune into a graphic novel. It was adapted by Robert Venditti, illustrated by Antoine Dod, and colored by Orpheus Collar, and was published on February 21, 2017.

Film adaptations

Percy Jackson & the Olympians: The Lightning Thief
Percy Jackson & the Olympians: The Lightning Thief (also known as Percy Jackson & The Lightning Thief) is a 2010 fantasy film directed by Chris Columbus. The film is loosely based on The Lightning Thief, the first novel in the Percy Jackson & the Olympians series by Rick Riordan. It stars Logan Lerman as Percy Jackson alongside an ensemble cast that includes Brandon T. Jackson, Alexandra Daddario, Jake Abel, Rosario Dawson, Steve Coogan, Uma Thurman, Catherine Keener, Kevin McKidd, Sean Bean and Pierce Brosnan. It was released to theaters on February 12, 2010. The film grossed $226,497,209 worldwide against a production budget of $95 million.

Percy Jackson: Sea of Monsters

Percy Jackson: Sea of Monsters (also known as Percy Jackson & The Sea of Monsters) is a 2013 fantasy film and the sequel to the 2010 film Percy Jackson & the Olympians: The Lightning Thief. It continues the adventures of Percy Jackson (Logan Lerman) and his friends, as they look for the golden fleece, in order to save Camp Half-Blood's magical borders from monsters. The film is based on the book The Sea of Monsters, and was released on August 7, 2013.

Musical theater adaptations

The Lightning Thief

The Lightning Thief is a two-hour-long 2017 Off-Broadway musical adaptation of the first Percy Jackson novel by Theatreworks USA. The stage play was written by Joe Tracz, with lyrics and music by Rob Rokicki, and the performance was directed by Stephen Brackett. The production had a 2019 US tour, touring 31 US cities. Following the tour, the Lighting Thief had a limited 16-week Broadway run at the Longacre Theatre and closed on January 5, 2020. 

Percy Jackson - The Myths and Legends: Camp Half Blood

2018 Interactive theatre performance touring UK Theatres, Schools, and literacy festivals. Following permission from Rick Riordan and Puffin books, the show was designed by Pushforward to encourage a love of reading and English literature. The show features stars such as UK actor Paul Andrew Goldsmith as Hermes.

Video games

Percy Jackson and the Olympians: The Lightning Thief
The Percy Jackson video game was created by Activision for the Nintendo DS and was released on February 9, 2010. The game was based mostly on the movie and featured players that were neither in the book nor the movie.

Television series

A streaming television adaptation is currently in production and is scheduled to be released on Disney+ in early 2024.

See also

 List of characters in mythology novels by Rick Riordan

Notes

References

External links
 Percy Jackson and the Olympians and The Heroes of Olympus series sites from publisher Disney (readriordan.com)
 Rick Riordan Myth Master at publisher Penguin Books (rickriordan.co.UK)
  – Percy Jackson universe and more
 Camp Half Blood RPG – RPG Game Site

 
Book series introduced in 2005